Best Foot Forward may refer to:

Best Foot Forward (musical), 1941 American Broadway musical
Best Foot Forward (film), 1943 American production of 1941 musical
Best Foot Forward (Max Liebman Presents), 1954 American live TV production of 1941 musical
Best Foot Forward (play), 2017 American musical documentary play
Best Foot Forward, 1985 compilation album by American rock band REO Speedwagon 
"Best Foot Forward", 1996 American song on studio album Endtroducing..... by DJ Shadow 
Best Foot Forward, 2022 television series based on Josh Sundquist's book Just Don't Fall